The national flag of Uruguay is one of the three official flags of Uruguay along with the flag of Artigas and the flag of the Treinta y Tres. It has a field of nine equal horizontal stripes alternating white and blue. The canton is white, charged with the Sun of May, from which 16 rays extend, alternating between triangular and wavy. The flag was first adopted by law on 18 December 1828, and had 19 alternating stripes of white and blue until 11 July 1830, when a new law reduced the number of alternating stripes to nine. The flag was designed by Joaquín Suárez.

Symbolism and design
The horizontal stripes on the flag represent the nine original departments of Uruguay, based on the U.S. flag, where the stripes represent the original 13 colonies. The first flag designed in 1828 had 9 light blue stripes; this number was reduced to 4 in 1830 due to visibility problems from distance. The stripes of blue and white were inspired by the flag of Argentina, making the flag of Uruguay part of both the Stars and Stripes and Belgrano flag families.

The golden Sun of May represents the May Revolution of 1810; the Sun of May is a figurative sun that represents Inti, the sun god and mythological founder of the Incan Empire. It also appears in the Flag of Argentina and the Coat of Arms of Bolivia.

Colors scheme
The specific color hues of the flag are not officially defined by law, however most representations use the following:

Co-official flags 
The National Pavilion shares its official status with two other flags, although it possesses a higher hierarchical position amongst them:

Historical banners

During Spanish rule:

Independence from Spain:

Flag of Cisplatina, under Portuguese/Brazilian rule between 1821 and 1825:

Uruguayan independence:

Historical flags

Variations 
During the Great Siege of Montevideo (1843–1851) Uruguay had two parallel governments, with two different flags:

Gallery

Flags of subdivisions

Departments

See also
 Coat of arms of Uruguay

References

External links

 
National flags
National symbols of Uruguay
1830 establishments in Uruguay